The 1977 CONCACAF Champions' Cup was the 13th edition of the annual international club football competition held in the CONCACAF region (North America, Central America and the Caribbean), the CONCACAF Champions' Cup. It determined that year's club champion of association football in the CONCACAF region and was played from 17 April 1977 till 18 February 1978.

The teams were split in 3 zones (North American, Central American and Caribbean), each one qualifying the winner to the final tournament, where the winners of the North and Central zones played a semi-final to decide who was going to play against the Caribbean champion in the final. All the matches in the tournament were played under the home/away match system.

Mexican club América beat Surinamese side Robinhood in the final, winning their first CONCACAF champion cup.

North American Zone

New York Inter-Giuliana withdrew
América advances to the CONCACAF Semi-Final.

Central American Zone

First round

Motagua: Bye
Barrio México did not have match dates communicated to them by CONCACAF, and failed to appear  for the first leg: CONCACAF awarded both legs to Diriangén 2-0.
Real España withdrew.
 Municipal, Diriangén and Saprissa advanced to the second round.

Second round

Motagua withdrew.
Municipal and Saprissa advance to the third round.

Third round

Saprissa advances to the CONCACAF Semi-Final.

Caribbean Zone

First round

Victory withdrew.
Violette and Robinhood advanced to the Second Round.
Voorwaarts on a bye to the Third Round.
TECSA on a bye to the Fourth Round.

{{Football box collapsible
| date       = 
| time       = 
| round      = 
| team1      = Violette 
| score      = 0-2
| aggregatescore = 2-3
| report     = 
| team2      =  Defence Force
| goals1     = Nil'''
| goals2     = 
| location   = 
| stadium    = 
| attendance = 
| referee    = 
| nobars     = Y
| note       = 
}}

Second round

Robinhood advanced to the third round.

Third round

Robinhood advanced to the fourth round.

Fourth round

Robinhood advanced to the CONCACAF Champions'Cup Final.

CONCACAF Final Series

Semi-final

Saprissa withdrew.
América advances to the CONCACAF Final.

Final

 First leg 

 Second leg América won 2–1 on aggregate''.

Champion

References

c
CONCACAF Champions' Cup
c